Gottfried Heinsius (April, 1709 – May 21, 1769) was a German mathematician, geographer and astronomer.

He was born near Naumburg and was awarded a Ph.D. in 1733 from the University of Leipzig with a dissertation on De viribus motricibus. Later he became professor of mathematics at the same institution. Professor Heinsius may have been the first to publish an announcement about the return of Halley's comet in 1759. From 1736–43 he taught in St. Petersburg with Leonhard Euler and was a member of the St. Petersburg Academy of Sciences. While in Russia, he was given the task to provide the Russian Tsar Ivan VI with a horoscope. He died in Leipzig. The crater Heinsius on the Moon is named after him.

References

1709 births
1769 deaths
18th-century German astronomers